Cherry Valley Township is one of the twenty-seven townships of Ashtabula County, Ohio, United States. The 2010 census found 955 people in the township.

Geography
Located in the southeastern part of the county, it borders the following townships:
Dorset Township - north
Richmond Township - northeast corner
Andover Township - east
Williamsfield Township - southeast corner
Wayne Township - south
Colebrook Township - southwest corner
New Lyme Township - west
Lenox Township - northwest corner

No municipalities are located in Cherry Valley Township.

Name and history
It is the only Cherry Valley Township statewide.

It was first settled in 1818 by former New York resident Nathaniel Hubbard.

Cherry Valley Township was named for the abundant cherry trees growing along a stream.

Government
The township is governed by a three-member board of trustees, who are elected in November of odd-numbered years to a four-year term beginning on the following January 1. Two are elected in the year after the presidential election and one is elected in the year before it. There is also an elected township fiscal officer, who serves a four-year term beginning on April 1 of the year after the election, which is held in November of the year before the presidential election. Vacancies in the fiscal officership or on the board of trustees are filled by the remaining trustees.  Currently, the board is composed of chairman Mark Savel and members Robert Gale and Jeff Smith.

Notable people
 General Leonard Wright Colby (1846-1924)

References

External links
County website

Townships in Ashtabula County, Ohio
Townships in Ohio